Paradigms of AI Programming: Case Studies in Common Lisp is a well-known programming book by Peter Norvig about artificial intelligence programming using Common Lisp.

History
The Lisp programming language has survived since 1958 as a primary language for Artificial Intelligence research. This text was published in 1992 as the Common Lisp standard was becoming widely adopted. Norvig introduces Lisp programming in the context of classic AI programs, including General Problem Solver (GPS) from 1959, ELIZA: Dialog with a Machine, from 1966, and STUDENT: Solving Algebra Word Problems, from 1964.  The book covers more recent AI programming techniques, including Logic Programming, Object-Oriented Programming, Knowledge Representation, Symbolic Mathematics and Expert Systems.

See also
Herbert A. Simon
J. C. Shaw
Allen Newell
Daniel G. Bobrow
Joseph Weizenbaum

References

 Norvig, Peter. Paradigms of Artificial Intelligence Programming: Case studies in Common Lisp. San Francisco, Calif: Morgan Kaufmann Publishers, 1992.

External links
Paradigms of Artificial Intelligence Programming: Case Studies in Common Lisp Book Homepage
Peter Norvig's Homepage
Source Code from Paradigms of Artificial Intelligence Programming
Introduction to Artificial Intelligence online class from Stanford

Artificial intelligence publications
Common Lisp publications
Computer science books